Kurt Helmudt (7 December 1943 – 7 September 2018) was a Danish rower. Together with Bjørn Hasløv, Erik Petersen and John Hansen he won a gold medal at the 1964 Summer Olympics and a silver medal at the 1964 European Championships in the coxless fours event. He also won a bronze medal at the 1970 World Rowing Championships with another team.

References

External links

 

1943 births
2018 deaths
Danish male rowers
Olympic rowers of Denmark
Rowers at the 1964 Summer Olympics
Olympic gold medalists for Denmark
Olympic medalists in rowing
World Rowing Championships medalists for Denmark
Medalists at the 1964 Summer Olympics
European Rowing Championships medalists
Rowers from Copenhagen
20th-century Danish people